Rajpara may refer to:

Places 
 Rajpara (Khodiyar), in Bhavnagar Rural (Vidhan Sabha constituency), Gujarat, India
 Rajpara (Tana), in Palitana (Vidhan Sabha constituency), Gujarat, India
 Rajpara State (Gohelwar), a former princely state in Gujarat, India
 Rajpara State (Halar), a former princely state in Gujarat, India
 Rajpara Thana, Bangladesh

People 
 Ankit Rajpara, Indian chess Grandmaster